Titi Ogufere is a Nigerian interior designer, critical design thinker and publisher at Essential Media Group. She is the Creative Director at Essential Interiors Consultancy, a pioneer interior designing company in Nigeria. The award-winning practice was set up in 2002 and has since established an international identity with a wide variety of projects that are context-specific, innovative, experimental, critical and theoretical.

In 2007, Ogufere founded the Interior Designers Association of Nigeria (IDAN), a body charged with the promotion of excellence practices in the interior design sector of Nigeria. She is also the founder of the Essential Media Group, a publishing company that publishes Essential Interior Magazine; a magazine on urban and contemporary interior design.

Ogufere was elected as President-Elect of the International Federation of Interior Architects/Designers (IFI) in 2017. She was announced as the 21st President of the International Federation of Interior Architects/Designers (IFI) on 27 February 2020. Making her the first President of African descent.

Early life and education 
Ogufere was born and raised in Nigeria. She attended Ahmadu Bello University, where she studied Mathematics and Library Science. She went ahead to obtain a degree  in Interior Design from Dublin. She thereafter obtained a Diploma in Events Management and PR from Dublin Business School.

She went further to obtain a certificate in Editorial design from London College of Arts.

Career 
Ogufere started her career in 2000 at Design Options LTD. In 2002, she founded Essential Interiors, a furniture manufacturing and interdisciplinary practice with operations in Lagos, Nigeria. In 2004, she traveled to Dublin to broaden her education, while she kept her company running in Nigeria. She served as an Ex-Officio Executive Committee member of the International Federation of Interior Architects/Designers (IFI), a position she held for 5 years.

In 2007, Ogufere founded Essential Media Group (EMG); a full-service media company that is into Publishing, Events and Digital Media. EMG publishes three leading magazines, organizes a design festival, two highly specialized exhibitions, two conferences, an awards gala, and has to date published over 25 books including This is Africa: Traditional Design, Modern and Contemporary (2017), In Conversation with Demas Nwoko  (2019) and Vernacular Design: Redefining the Narrative (2019).

In 2017, Ogufere launched the African Culture and Design Festival, an exhibition geared towards showcasing traditional, modern, and contemporary African Art and Design. The event was organized by the Interior Design Association of Nigeria in partnership IFI, with the theme; This is Africa.

In 2019, she launched Design Week Lagos (DWL), an annual event. Design Week Lagos has played host to a number events across the city of Lagos, including; Design Kulture Exhibition, MADE by Design Show, Tourism Investors Forum, Sound for Design, Reflection for Happy Spaces, and Vocational Training Week.

References

Living people
Year of birth missing (living people)
Ahmadu Bello University alumni
Alumni of Dublin Business School
Interior designers